Edito "Ala" Villamor (born October 10, 1970) is a Filipino former professional boxer. Competing from 1989 to 1996, he challenged twice for mini-flyweight world championships; the IBF title in 1993 and the WBC title in 1996.

Biography and career
Villamor turned professional in 1989 along with his contemporaries were Andy Tabanas, Gerry Peñalosa, Rey Cosep and the Alfante brothers. He held the Philippines mini flyweight champion between 1990 and 1993, with never been defeated, by defeating many skilled boxers were Nico Thomas, Napa Kiatwanchai, Ronnie Magramo. During that time he was regarded as the rising star Filipino boxer who had hopes of becoming a future world champion.

He had the opportunity to challenge the world champion for the first time with Thailand's Ratanapol Sor Vorapin, the IBF mini flyweight title holder on June 27, 1993 at Nimibutr Stadium, National Stadium, Bangkok, Thailand. He lost TKO in the seventh round, Sor Vorapin retained title for the second time, Villamor suffered his first defeat.

Villamor had the opportunity to challenge for world title for the second time with the WBC strawweight champion the undefeated Mexican Ricardo López on March 16, 1996 at MGM Grand Garden Arena, Paradise, Nevada, U.S. As a result, he lost TKO in the early eighth round with López's left uppercut. Villamor retired after this bout.

He worked as a trainer and matchmaker of ALA Promotions, a major boxing promotions company in the Philippines.

References

External links

1970 births
Living people
Mini-flyweight boxers 
Filipino male boxers
People from Davao del Sur
Southpaw boxers
Boxing trainers